Kate Garraway's Life Stories (formerly known as Piers Morgan's Life Stories until 2021 and also known as just Life Stories) is a British television chat show on ITV, presented by Kate Garraway and was formerly presented by Piers Morgan. Recorded in front of a studio audience, each episode is devoted to one celebrity guest. Episodes are filmed at Television Centre (although they were previously made at Teddington Studios and The London Studios) between one and two weeks before being broadcast on television. On 21 October 2021, it was confirmed that Morgan was leaving the show and would be replaced by Kate Garraway, his final guest.

Episode guide

Transmissions

Series 1

Series 2

Series 3

Series 4

Series 5

Series 6

Series 7

Series 8

Series 9

Series 10

Series 11

Series 12

Series 13

Series 14

Series 15

Series 16

Series 17

Series 18

Series 19

Series 20
Piers Morgan’s final series as host.

Series 21
Kate Garraway’s first series as host.

Special episodes
Three special episodes with Sir Cliff Richard, Lord Lloyd-Webber and Lord Sugar have aired.

References

External links
 
 
 

2009 British television series debuts
2000s British television talk shows
2010s British television talk shows
2020s British television talk shows
English-language television shows
ITV talk shows
ITV (TV network) original programming
Television series by ITV Studios